Peace River Corridor Provincial Park is a 2014 ha provincial park in British Columbia, Canada.

It is located on the banks of the Peace River, at the confluence with Kiskatinaw River, downstream from Taylor. It is in the Boreal White and Black Spruce biogeoclimatic zone within the Peace Lowlands ecosection. It is used by ungulates as a winter range and by migratory waterfowl as a staging area.

References

British Columbia. Ministry of Employment and Investment (March 1999). Dawson Creek Land & Resource Management Plan, p.48.
Ministry of Environment

External links

Peace River Regional District
Provincial parks of British Columbia
2000 establishments in British Columbia
Protected areas established in 2000